Everywoman is a lost 1919 American silent film allegory film directed by George Melford based on a 1911 play Everywoman by Walter Browne. Violet Heming appears as the title character supported by several Paramount character stars.

Cast
Theodore Roberts as Wealth
Violet Heming as Everywoman
Clara Horton as Youth
Wanda Hawley as Beauty
Margaret Loomis as Modesty
Mildred Reardon as Conscience
Edythe Chapman as Truth
Bebe Daniels as Vice
Monte Blue as Love
Irving Cummings as Passion
James Neill as Nobody
Raymond Hatton as Flattery
Lucien Littlefield as Lord Witness
Noah Beery as Bluff
Jay Dwiggins as Stuff
Tully Marshall as Puff
Robert Brower as Age
Charles Stanton Ogle as Time
Fred Huntley as Dissipation
Clarence Geldart as Auctioneer

See also
Experience (1921)

References

External links

1919 films
American silent feature films
Everyman
Lost American films
American films based on plays
Films directed by George Melford
Paramount Pictures films
1919 drama films
American black-and-white films
1919 lost films
Lost drama films
1910s American films
1910s English-language films